Gianfranco Burchiellaro (born 7 February 1960) was an Italian politician who served as Mayor of Mantua (1996–2005) and Deputy (2006–2008).

References

1960 births
Living people
Mayors of Mantua
Deputies of Legislature XV of Italy
20th-century Italian politicians
21st-century Italian politicians
Democratic Party of the Left politicians
Democrats of the Left politicians
Democratic Party (Italy) politicians